The 2019 Chinese Artistic Gymnastics Championships were held from 8 May to 13 May 2019, in Zhaoqing, Guangdong.

Women's Medalists

Men's Medalists

References

Chinese Artistic Gymnastics Championships
2019 in Chinese sport
Chinese Artistic Gymnastics Championships